Alain Baraton, born 10 September 1957 in La Celle-Saint-Cloud, is a master gardener. Since 1982, he has been gardener-in-chief of the park at the Palace of Versailles

He speaks regularly on radio France Inter and is the producer of the show La main verte, also broadcast on France Inter.

Publications

 Le Monde des écorces, photographies de Christophe Madamour, Rodez, Éd. du Rouergue, 2003 
 Le Monde des arbres d'ornement, photographies de Christophe Madamour, Rodez, Éd. du Rouergue, 2005 
 Sagesse paysanne: 366 proverbes et dictons au rythme des saisons, photographies de Pierre Collombert,  with Pierre Collombert, Romagnat, Éd. de Borée, 2005 
 1000 questions, 1000 réponses, Rodez, Éd. du Rouergue, 2006 
 L'homme à la main verte: mes chroniques à France Inter, with Snezana Gerbault, Rodez, Éd. du Rouergue, 2006 
 Le Jardinier de Versailles, Paris, B. Grasset, 2006 
 Le Jardin de Versailles vu par Alain Baraton, Paris, Hugo image, 2007 
 La Véritable Histoire des jardins de Versailles, with Jean-Pierre Coffe, Paris, Plon, 2007 
 Savoir tout faire du bon jardinier, photographies de Vincent Motte, Paris, Flammarion, 2008 
 L'Amour à Versailles, with Laure de Chantal, Paris, B. Grasset, 2009 
 Les Parterres de Le Nôtre, Paris, N. Chaudun, Fondation pour le Domaine de Chantilly, 2009 
 Je plante, donc je suis, Paris, Grasset, 2010
 Walks in the Gardens of Versailles, Editions Artlys, 2010
 Vice et Versailles – Crimes, trahisons et autres empoisonnements au palais du Roi-Soleil, Paris, B. Grasset, 2011
 Dictionnaire amoureux des jardins, Paris, Plon, 2012
 La Haine de l'arbre n'est pas une fatalité, Arles, Actes Sud, 2013
 L'Amour au jardin, Paris, B. Grasset, 2014

References

Other projects

External links
 « Rencontre avec Alain Baraton, le jardinier de Versailles », par Fred-Éric Vignale et Sophie Petit, Le Mague, 19 juin 2006

1957 births
Living people
People from Yvelines
French gardeners